David Packard Medal of Achievement (formerly AeA Medal of Achievement) is presented by the California Technology Council. The Medal was previously presented by TechAmerica (formerly AeA), between 1959 and the ultimate closure and breakup of TechAmerica in 2013.  An award dinner is held to honor the current recipient and to hear from a variety of those influenced by the honoree, including an expression of their impact on the technology industry.  This award is the highest award bestowed by the California Technology Council.

Recipients 
Recipients are selected for their contributions to technology, community, and humankind.

References

Technology trade associations